Howard Lassiter Penny Jr. (born August 5, 1947) is an American politician who is a Republican member of the North Carolina House of Representatives. He represents the 53rd district, which includes Harnett County, North Carolina and he took the oath of office on September 17, 2020. He is a retired businessman in the agriculture industry and served on the Harnett County Commission.

Electoral history

2020

2016

2014

2012

Committee assignments

2021-2022 session
Appropriations 
Appropriations - General Government
Agriculture
State Personnel (Vice Chair)
Wildlife Resources

References

External links

Living people
1947 births
County commissioners in North Carolina
Republican Party members of the North Carolina House of Representatives
People from Harnett County, North Carolina
21st-century American politicians